The Forsyte Saga, first published under that title in 1922, is a series of three novels and two interludes published between 1906 and 1921 by the English author John Galsworthy, who won the Nobel Prize in Literature. They chronicle the vicissitudes of the leading members of a large upper-middle-class English family that is similar to Galsworthy's. Only a few generations removed from their farmer ancestors, its members are keenly aware of their status as "new money". The main character, the solicitor and connoisseur Soames Forsyte, sees himself as a "man of property" by virtue of his ability to accumulate material possessions, but that does not succeed in bringing him pleasure.

Separate sections of the saga, as well as the lengthy story in its entirety, have been adapted for cinema and television. The Man of Property, the first book, was adapted in 1949 by Hollywood as That Forsyte Woman, starring Errol Flynn, Greer Garson, Walter Pidgeon, and Robert Young. In 1967, the BBC produced a popular 26-part serial that dramatised The Forsyte Saga and a subsequent trilogy concerning the Forsytes, A Modern Comedy. In 2002 Granada Television produced two series for the ITV network: The Forsyte Saga and The Forsyte Saga: To Let. Both made runs in the US as parts of Masterpiece Theatre. In 2003, The Forsyte Saga was listed as #123 on the BBC's The Big Read poll of the UK's "best-loved novel".

Following The Forsyte Saga, Galsworthy wrote two more trilogies and several more interludes based around the titular family. The resulting series is collectively titled The Forsyte Chronicles.

Books

The Man of Property (1906)
In this first novel of the Forsyte Saga, after introducing us to the impressive array of Forsytes headed by the formidable Aunt Ann, Galsworthy moves into the main action of the saga by detailing Soames Forsyte's desire to own things, including his beautiful wife, Irene Forsyte (née Heron). The character of Irene is based upon Galsworthy's wife Ada Galsworthy. Forsyte is jealous of her friendships and wants her to be his alone. He concocts a plan to move her to a house he is having built at Robin Hill, away from everyone she knows and cares for. She resists his grasping intentions, and falls in love with the architect Philip Bosinney, who has been engaged by Soames to build the house. Bosinney returns her love, although he is the fiancé of her young friend June Forsyte, the daughter of Soames's estranged cousin "Young" Jolyon. There is no happy ending: Irene leaves Soames after he asserts what he perceives to be his ultimate right on his property by raping her, and Bosinney dies under the wheels of a bus after being driven frantic by the news of the rape.

"Indian Summer of a Forsyte" (1918)
In a short interlude after The Man of Property Galsworthy delves into the newfound friendship between Irene and Old Jolyon Forsyte (June's grandfather, now the owner of the house Soames had built). This attachment gives Old Jolyon pleasure, but exhausts his strength. He leaves Irene money in his will, with Young Jolyon, his son, as trustee. In the end Old Jolyon dies under an ancient oak tree in the garden of the Robin Hill house.

In Chancery (1920)
The marital discord of both Soames and his sister Winifred is the subject of the second novel (the title refers to the Court of Chancery, which dealt with domestic issues). They take steps to divorce their spouses, Irene and Montague Dartie respectively. However, while Soames tells his sister to brave the consequences of going to court, he is unwilling to go through a divorce. Instead he stalks and hounds Irene, follows her abroad, and asks her to have his child, which was his father's wish.

Irene inherits £15,000 after Old Jolyon's death. His son, Young Jolyon Forsyte, also Soames's cousin, manages Irene's finances. When she first leaves Soames, Young Jolyon offers his support. By the time his son Jolly dies in the South African War, Irene has developed a strong friendship with Jolyon. Then Soames confronts young Jolyon and Irene at Robin Hill, falsely accusing them of having an affair. Young Jolyon and Irene assert that they have had an affair because Soames has it in his mind already. This statement gives Soames the evidence he needs for divorce proceedings. That confrontation sparks an eventual consummation between young Jolyon and Irene, leading to their marriage once the divorce is final and the birth of a son Jolyon "Jon" Forsyte. Soames marries Annette, the young daughter of a French Soho restaurant owner. With his new wife, he has his only child, a daughter named Fleur Forsyte.

"Awakening" (1920)
The subject of the second interlude is the naive and exuberant lifestyle of eight-year-old Jon Forsyte. He loves and is loved by his parents. He has an idyllic youth, and his every desire indulged.

To Let (1921)
This novel concludes the Forsyte Saga. Second cousins Fleur and Jon Forsyte meet and fall in love, ignorant of their parents' past troubles, indiscretions and misdeeds. Once Soames, Jolyon, and Irene discover their romance, they forbid their children to see each other again. Irene and Jolyon also fear that Fleur is too much like her father, and once she has Jon in her grasp, will want to possess him entirely. Despite her feelings for Jon, Fleur has a very suitable suitor, Michael Mont, heir to a baronetcy, who has fallen in love with her. If they marry, Fleur would elevate the status of her family from nouveau riche to the aristocratic upper class. The title derives from Soames' reflections as he breaks up the house in which his Uncle Timothy, recently deceased in 1920 at age 101 and the last of the older generation of Forsytes, had lived a recluse, hoarding his life like property.

Knowing he is soon to die from a weak heart, Jolyon writes a letter to Jon, detailing the events of Irene's marriage to Soames, including her love affair with Philip Bosinney and Soames's rape of her and warns him that Irene would be alone if he were to marry Fleur. But while Jon reads the letter, Jolyon suddenly dies of a heart attack, and Jon is left torn between the past and his present love for Fleur. He ultimately rejects Fleur, breaking his own heart as well as hers, and leaves for Canada. Fleur marries Michael Mont, though she knows she doesn't love him. With her marriage, Soames is separated from the only person whom he has truly loved. Irene also leaves for Canada, selling the house at Robin Hill. Soames and Irene briefly exchange glances at a distance and a kind of peace is made between them, but Soames is left contemplating all that he never really had but tried to possess.

Adaptations

Twentieth century

Silent films
In the silent film era, the book was filmed in 1920 and 1922.

1949 movie
A 1949 adaptation, called That Forsyte Woman in its United States release, starred Errol Flynn as Soames, Greer Garson as Irene, Walter Pidgeon as Young Jolyon, and Robert Young as Philip Bosinney.

1967 serial

A television adaptation by the BBC of The Forsyte Saga, and its sequel trilogy A Modern Comedy, starred Eric Porter as Soames, Joseph O'Conor as Old Jolyon, Susan Hampshire as Fleur, Kenneth More as Young Jolyon and Nyree Dawn Porter as Irene. It was produced by Donald Wilson and was shown in 26 episodes on Saturday evenings between 7 January and 1 July 1967 on BBC2. It was the repeat on Sunday evenings on BBC1 starting on 8 September 1968 that secured the programme's success, with 18 million tuning in for the final episode in 1969. It was shown in the United States on public television and broadcast all over the world, and became the first British television programme to be sold to the Soviet Union.

Radio adaptations 
There have been various BBC radio dramatisations. The first was probably a radio production of The Man of Property  in 11 weekly parts commencing 9 December 1945 on the BBC Home Service. The music used as the opening and closing theme came from Edward Elgar's Enigma Variations, specifically the Nimrod variation. This adaptation starred Leo Genn as Jo, Grizelda Hervey as Irene and Ronald Simpson as Soames.  It was adapted by Muriel Levy and produced by Val Gielgud and Felix Felton. Young Jolyons in later adaptations included Andrew Cruickshank, Leo Genn and Guy Rolfe. Another production of the dramatised cycle, which had Rachel Gurney as Irene, Noel Johnson as Young Jolyon and Alan Wheatley as Soames, came soon after the 1967 television series. The version broadcast in 1990 comprised a 75-minute opening episode followed by 22 hour-long episodes, entitled The Forsyte Chronicles. It was the most expensive radio drama serial ever broadcast, due to its length and its big-name cast, which included Dirk Bogarde, Diana Quick, Michael Williams and Alan Howard. This radio series was rerun on BBC 7 radio in 2004, and has been released commercially.

In January 2016, BBC Radio 4 began broadcasting a new radio adaptation by Shaun McKenna and Lin Coghlan under the title The Forsytes, scheduled to continue until late 2017. The cast was led by Joseph Millson as Soames, Jessica Raine as Fleur, Juliet Aubrey as Irene, Harry Haddon Paton as Bosinney and Ewan Bailey as Young Jolyon.  It was directed by Marion Nancarrow and Gemma Jenkins.

Twenty-first century

The Forsyte Saga (2002)

In 2002, the first two books and the first interlude were adapted by Granada Television for the ITV network, although, like the 1967 production, the miniseries took many liberties with Galsworthy's original work. Additional funding for this production was provided by American PBS station WGBH, the BBC version having been a success on PBS in the early 1970s.

The Forsyte Saga: To Let (2003 serial)

Immediately following the success of the 2002 adaptation, a second series was released in 2003. It portrays the saga's last book To Let. Much of the cast resumed their roles, but most of the first generation of Forsytes had died in the previous series. The principal characters played by Damian Lewis, Gina McKee, Rupert Graves, and Amanda Root return. It has also been released on DVD.

Main characters

The old Forsytes
 Ann, the eldest of the family
 Old Jolyon, the eldest brother, made a fortune in tea
 James, a solicitor, married to Emily, a most tranquil woman
 Swithin, James's twin brother with aristocratic pretensions, a bachelor
 Roger, "the original Forsyte"
 Julia (Juley), Mrs. Septimus Small, a fluttery dowager 
 Hester, an old maid
 Nicholas, the wealthiest in the family
 Timothy, the most cautious man in England
 Susan, the married sister

The young Forsytes
 Young Jolyon, Old Jolyon's artistic and free-thinking son, married three times
 Soames, James and Emily's son, an intense, unimaginative and possessive solicitor and connoisseur, married to the unhappy Irene, who later marries Young Jolyon
 Winifred, Soames's sister, one of the three daughters of James and Emily, married to the foppish and lethargic Montague Dartie
 George, Roger's son, a dyed-in-the-wool mocker
 Francie, George's sister and Roger's daughter, emancipated from God

Their children
 June, Young Jolyon's defiant daughter from his first marriage; engaged to an architect, Philip Bosinney, who becomes Irene's lover
 Jolly, Young Jolyon's son from his second marriage; dies of enteric fever during the Boer War
 Holly, Young Jolyon's daughter from his second marriage, to June's governess
 Jon, Young Jolyon's son from his third marriage, to Irene, Soames's first wife
 Fleur, Soames's daughter from his second marriage, to a French Soho shop girl Annette; Jon's lover; later marries the heir of a baronet, Michael Mont
 Val, Winifred and Montague's son; fights in the Boer War; marries his cousin Holly
 Imogen, Winifred and Montague's daughter

Others
 Parfitt, Old Jolyon's butler
 Smither, Aunts Ann, Juley and Hester's housekeeper
 Warmson, James and Emily's butler
 Bilson, Soames's housemaid
 Prosper Profond, Winifred's admirer and Annette's lover

Themes
Duty versus Desire: Young Jolyon was the favourite of the family until he left his wife for his daughter's governess. He eschews his status in society and in the Forsyte clan to follow his heart. Soames, though it seems he is the polar opposite of Jolyon, has those same inclinations toward doing what he desires. For example, instead of finding a wife who is rich, he marries Irene and then Annette, who have neither money nor status. When he takes Irene to a play about a married woman and her lover, he ironically sympathizes with the lover and not the husband. However, most of his decisions are on the side of duty.

Generations and Change: The many generations of the Forsyte clan remind everyone of what has come to pass over the years. However, as the old ranks begin to die, people are able to change. For example, after a few generations, the fact that they are nouveau riche does not matter as much. This is also the case with Soames and Irene's marital problems. Once they grow old and their children can overcome their parents' past, Soames can finally let go of the past. Another change with generations is the diminished number of Forsyte offspring.  Many of the second generation have fewer children.

Sequels

Galsworthy's sequel to The Forsyte Saga was A Modern Comedy, written in the years 1924 to 1928. This comprises the novel The White Monkey; an interlude, A Silent Wooing; a second novel, The Silver Spoon; a second interlude, Passers By; and a third novel, Swan Song. The principal characters are Soames and Fleur, and the second saga ends with the death of Soames in 1926. This is also the point reached at the end of the 1967 television series.

Galsworthy wrote one further trilogy, End of the Chapter, comprising Maid in Waiting, Flowering Wilderness, and Over the River (also known as One More River), chiefly dealing with Michael Mont's young cousin, Dinny Cherrell.

The three trilogies have been republished under the collective title of The Forsyte Chronicles.

In 1930 Galsworthy published On Forsyte 'Change, which deals in the main with the older Forsytes before the events chronicled in The Man of Property. Galsworthy states in a foreword that "They have all been written since Swan Song was finished but in place they come between the Saga and the Comedy ..." By way of explanation he writes that "It is hard to part suddenly and finally from those with whom one has lived so long; and these footnotes do really, I think, help to fill in and round out the chronicles of the Forsyte family."

 Contents
 The Buckles of Superior Dosset, 1821–63
 Sands of Time, 1821–63
 Hester's Little Tour, 1845
 Tiimothy's Narrow Squeak, 1851
 Aunt Juley's Courtship, 1855
 Nicholas Rex, 1864
 A Sad Affair, 1867
 Revolt at Roger's, 1870
 June's First Lame Duck, 1876
 Dog at Timothy's, 1878
 Midsummer Madness, 1880
 The Hondekoeter, 1880
 Cry of Peacock, 1883
 Francie's Fourpenny Foreigner, 1888
 Four-In-Hand Forsyte, 1890
 The Sorrows of Tweetyman, 1895
 The Dromios, 1900
 A Forsyte Encounters the People, 1917
 Soames and the Flag, 1914–1918

In 1994 Suleika Dawson published a sequel to The Forsytes titled The Forsytes: The Saga Continues  in which Soames's daughter, Fleur, Lady Mont, is the main character. She has been a dutiful wife and mother, and has long forgotten her love for Jon Forsyte, but when tragedy brings Jon back to England Fleur is determined to recapture the past and the love of her life.

Awards
The Forsyte Saga earned John Galsworthy the Nobel Prize for Literature in 1932.

References

External links

 
 Full text of The Forsyte Saga at Project Gutenberg
 
Encyclopedia of Television (1967 series)
British Film Institute Screen Online (1967 series)

 
1906 British novels
Book series introduced in 1906
Novel series
Family saga novels
British novels adapted into television shows